S. alboniger may refer to:
 Streptomyces alboniger, a bacterium species
 Spizaetus alboniger, a synonym for Nisaetus alboniger, the Blyth's hawk-eagle, a bird of prey species found in Peninsula Malaysia, Singapore, Sumatra and Borneo